Ronald N. Montaperto is a former Defense Intelligence Agency (DIA) analyst who pleaded guilty to mishandling classified documents. U.S. officials said the disclosures by Montaperto coincided with the loss of a major electronic eavesdropping program which had successfully spied on Chinese government links to illicit arms sales.

Montaperto, 66, joined the DIA in 1981 and eight years later sought a post at the CIA. Eventually, suspicions were raised that he was a spy for China. He was first identified in the late 1990s by a Chinese defector as one of ten "dear friends" who were informal agents of the Chinese government. An investigation of his links to Chinese intelligence in 1991 was dropped for lack of evidence. During questioning by investigators in Hawaii in 2003, where he was dean of the Asia-Pacific Center for Security Studies, Montaperto said he verbally gave Col. Yang and Col. Yu both "secret" and "top secret" information.

Montaperto, who claimed that he was tricked, served a three-month sentence in jail, in part due to letters of support from other intelligence analysts. One such supporter, Lonnie Henley, was initially reprimanded by the Office of the Director of National Intelligence (ODNI) for his accusations of malfeasance by the FBI during the investigation of Montaperto.

See also 
Chinese intelligence operations in the United States

References

Chinese spies
Living people
Analysts of the Defense Intelligence Agency
Year of birth missing (living people)